John Cunningham (born 22 November 1940) is a former Australian rules footballer who played for Hawthorn in the VFL. He was a member of the first ever Hawthorn premiership side, playing in the forward pocket in the Grand Final, in only his 7th senior game.

References

External links

1940 births
Australian rules footballers from Victoria (Australia)
Hawthorn Football Club players
Hawthorn Football Club Premiership players
University Blues Football Club players
Living people
One-time VFL/AFL Premiership players